Laminariaceae is a family of brown algal seaweeds, many genera of which are popularly called "kelp". The table indicates the genera within this family. The family includes the largest known seaweeds: Nereocystis and Macrocystis.

References

Further reading

External links

 
Brown algae families